Střevíčky slečny Pavlíny is a 1941 Czechoslovak film. The film starred Josef Kemr.

References

External links
 

1941 films
Czechoslovak comedy films
1940s Czech-language films
Czech comedy films
1940s Czech films